Clare Ezeakacha  (born May 26, 1985) is a Nigerian  Actress, producer, Nigerian film director, Broadcaster and Child Advocate known for her films Arima and Gone Grey.

Early life

Clare Ezeakacha was born in Lagos but hails from Anambra State, Nigeria. She went to Charles Heery Memorial Junior and Secondary for her lower education. Ezeakacha holds a BSc in Computer Science from Madonna University, Elele and Postgraduate diploma from the University of Nigeria Nsukka.

Career
Clare began her career in 2011 as an on- air personality.
In 2016, she delved into film-making and she had produced and directed several nollywood films, including: "Jack of All Trade" , "Two Wrongs" , "Arima" and " Smoke" which was nominated for Best Short Competition at the 2018 Africa International Film Festival.

Selected filmography (as director)
 Smoke (2018)
Arima (2017) 
 Ordinary Fellow (2018) (assistant director)

Selected filmography (as producer)
 Gone Grey (2016) 
Arima (2017) 
 The Employee (2017) 
Mystified (2017) (associate producer)
 JOAT, Jack of All Trade (2017) 
 Two Wrongs (2019) 
 Friends Only (2020)

Award

See also
 List of Nigerian film producers

References

External links

 CLARE EZEAKACHA WINS THE OMA LIVING SHOW UNSUNG HEROES AWARD 2020 IN THE REGIONAL SPIRIT CATEGORY 
 Clare Ezeakacha | Nigeria | Speaking Up

Living people
Nigerian film directors
Actresses from Lagos State
21st-century Nigerian actresses
Nigerian women film directors
Nigerian film producers
1986 births